Trevor Mbakwe (born January 24, 1989) is an American professional basketball coach and former player. Before turning pro, he played for the Minnesota Golden Gophers men's basketball team. He is from St. Paul, Minnesota and attended St. Bernards High School.

Collegiate career
Before attending the University of Minnesota, Mbakwe played at Marquette University for the 2007–08 season where he suffered from chronic knee injuries. For his 2008–09 season, he transferred to Miami Dade College and led his team to the Southern Conference Championship. After redshirting in 2009–10, Mbakwe transferred to the University of Minnesota to play under head coach Tubby Smith. In his first year playing for Smith, he led the Big Ten Conference in rebounding at 10.5 rebounds per game. He was the first player for the Gophers since Kris Humphries to lead the Big Ten in rebounding, and also became number three on the all time rebounding list at the University of Minnesota when he collected 327 rebounds that season.

Professional career
In July 2013, Mbakwe signed his first professional contract with the Italian team Virtus Roma. On August 22, 2013, it was officially confirmed that he signed contract for the 2013–14 season.

On July 6, 2014, he signed with the German club Brose Baskets for the 2014–15 season.

On July 1, 2015, he signed a three-year contract with the Israeli club Maccabi Tel Aviv. After one season, he parted ways with Maccabi.

On July 6, 2016, Mbakwe signed a one-year deal with Spanish club Unicaja. Two months later, the club rescinded his contract after he did not pass his medical test.

On November 3, 2016, he signed with Russian club Zenit Saint Petersburg. On June 6, 2017, Zenit announced the end of their cooperation with Mbakwe.

Mbakwe signed with Fiat Torino of the Lega Basket Serie A and EuroCup on July 27, 2017. On February 18, 2018, Mbakwe went to win the 2018 edition of the Italian Basketball Cup with Fiat Torino by beating Germani Basket Brescia 69–67 in the Finals. On September 26, 2018, Mbakwe signed with MHP Riesen Ludwigsburg of the Basketball Bundesliga. On April 25, 2019, Mbakwe signed with AEK Athens for the Greek Basket League playoffs, after a brief stint in Japan with Osaka Evessa.

Coaching career
On June 12, 2020, Mbakwe was named as assistant coach at Benilde-St. Margaret's High School.

Career statistics

Domestic leagues

References

External links
Euroleague.net Profile
RealGM.com Profile

1989 births
Living people
AEK B.C. players
American expatriate basketball people in Germany
American expatriate basketball people in Greece
American expatriate basketball people in Israel
American expatriate basketball people in Italy
American expatriate basketball people in Russia
American men's basketball players
American sportspeople of Nigerian descent
Auxilium Pallacanestro Torino players
Basketball players from Saint Paul, Minnesota
BC Zenit Saint Petersburg players
Brose Bamberg players
Lega Basket Serie A players
Maccabi Tel Aviv B.C. players
Marquette Golden Eagles men's basketball players
Miami Dade Sharks men's basketball players
Minnesota Golden Gophers men's basketball players
Osaka Evessa players
Pallacanestro Virtus Roma players
Power forwards (basketball)
Riesen Ludwigsburg players